James Halyburton or Haliburton may refer to:
 James Haliburton, 5th Lord Haliburton of Dirleton (died c. 1502), Lord Haliburton of Dirleton
 James Halyburton (reformer) (1518–1589), Scottish Protestant reformer
 Sir James Halyburton (fl. 1586–1617), commissioner for Forfarshire in 1617, great-nephew of the above
 James Halyburton (1707 MP) (died c. 1743), commissioner for Forfarshire in 1702 and Member of Parliament for Forfarshire in 1707
 James Halyburton (Orkney and Shetland MP) (died 1765), British Army officer and Member of Parliament for Orkney and Shetland
 James Burton (Egyptologist) (born James Haliburton, 1786–1862), British Egyptologist
 James Dandridge Halyburton (1803–1879), United States federal judge

See also
 Halyburton (disambiguation)